Evagoras Antoniou (born 4 November 2002) is a Cypriot professional footballer who plays as a centre-back for Greek Super League 2 club Panathinaikos B.

References

2002 births
Living people
Cypriot footballers
Cypriot First Division players
AEL Limassol players
Cypriot Second Division players
Super League Greece 2 players
Panathinaikos F.C. players
Association football defenders
Panathinaikos F.C. B players
Cypriot expatriate footballers
Cypriot expatriate sportspeople in Greece
Expatriate footballers in Greece
Sportspeople from Limassol